Fan Qi (born 18 April 1971) is a Chinese policeman and football referee who has been a full international referee for FIFA.

Fan became a FIFA referee in 2008. He served as a referee for the 2014 FIFA World Cup qualifiers, beginning with the preliminary-round match between Nepal and Jordan.

References 

1971 births
Sportspeople from Beijing
Living people
Chinese football referees
Chinese police officers